Magnus Johnson (September 19, 1871September 13, 1936) was an American farmer and politician. He served in the United States Senate and United States House of Representatives from Minnesota as a member of the Farmer–Labor Party. Johnson is the only Swedish-born person to serve in the U.S. Senate.

Biography
Johnson was born near Karlstad, Sweden, and his family moved to La Crosse, Wisconsin, United States, in 1891. They moved to Meeker County, Minnesota, in 1893.

He worked as a millhand and lumberjack, became a farmer, and by 1913 was the leader of the Minnesota branch of the American Society of Equity and Vice President of the Equity-owned Equity Co-operative Grain Exchange and Farmers' Terminal Packing Co. He served in both the Minnesota House of Representatives and the Minnesota Senate before being elected to the U.S. Senate on the Farmer-Labor ticket, to fill the seat opened because of the death of Knute Nelson. Johnson served in the Senate from July 16, 1923 to March 3, 1925, in the 68th congress. He lost his bid for reelection in 1924. He was elected to the U.S. House of Representatives and served March 4, 1933, to January 3, 1935, in the 73rd congress, winning one of the general ticket seats. Subsequently, he resumed agricultural pursuits and served as state supervisor of public stockyards 1934 – 1936. He was an unsuccessful candidate for the Farmer-Labor nomination for Governor of Minnesota in 1936.

Johnson died in Litchfield, where he had gone for medical treatment, on September 13, 1936, and his interment is in Dassel Community Cemetery in Dassel, Minnesota.

A son of his, Francis Austin Johnson (1904-1989) is the creator of the World's Biggest Ball of Twine; the twine ball rests under an enclosed pagoda in Darwin Township, Minnesota. He is interred in the same cemetery, near his father.

See also
List of United States senators born outside the United States

References

External links

|-

1871 births
1936 deaths
American Lutherans
Members of the Minnesota House of Representatives
Members of the United States House of Representatives from Minnesota
Minnesota state senators
People from Meeker County, Minnesota
Swedish emigrants to the United States
United States senators from Minnesota
Farmer–Labor Party United States senators
Minnesota Farmer–Laborites
Farmer–Labor Party members of the United States House of Representatives
Leaders of the American Society of Equity